Mads Vibe-Hastrup (born 20 November 1978) is a Danish professional golfer.

Vibe-Hastrup was born in Helsingør. He turned professional in 1999.

Vibe-Hastrup qualified for the European Tour after finishing 11th on the 2001 Challenge Tour rankings. Since then he has struggled to establish himself on the elite tour, regaining his card for the 2003 and 2007 seasons at qualifying school, and returning to the second tier Challenge Tour in 2006.

Vibe-Hastrup has only broken into the top 100 on the European Tour Order of Merit on one occasion, in 2007, when he finished in 61st place. That same season, he won his first tournament on the European Tour at the 2007 Open de Madrid Valle Romano, which granted him a two-year exemption on the tour, and finished runner-up in the Celtic Manor Wales Open. He was unable to maintain that form into 2008, making only seven cuts as he slipped to 177th on the money list. He lost his card in 2009 and returned to the Challenge Tour.

Amateur wins
1996 Doug Sanders World Boys Championship

Professional wins (5)

European Tour wins (1)

Challenge Tour wins (1)

Challenge Tour playoff record (0–1)

Nordic Golf League wins (3)

Team appearances
Amateur
European Boys' Team Championship (representing Denmark): 1995, 1996
Eisenhower Trophy (representing Denmark): 1996, 1998
European Amateur Team Championship (representing Denmark): 1997
Jacques Léglise Trophy (representing the Continent of Europe): 1995, 1996 (winners)

See also
2006 Challenge Tour graduates

References

External links

Danish male golfers
European Tour golfers
Sportspeople from the Capital Region of Denmark
People from Helsingør
1978 births
Living people